The forms of Chinese furniture evolved along three distinct lineages which dates back to 1000 BC, based on frame and panel, yoke and rack (based on post and rail seen in architecture) and bamboo construction techniques. Chinese home furniture evolved independently of Western furniture into many similar forms including chairs, tables, stools, cupboards, cabinets, beds and sofas. Until about the 10th century CE the Chinese sat on mats or low platforms using low tables, in typical Asian style, but then gradually moved to using high tables with chairs.

Chinese furniture is mostly in plain polished wood, but from at least the Song dynasty the most luxurious pieces often used lacquer to cover the whole or parts of the visible areas. All the various sub-techniques of Chinese lacquerware can be found on furniture, and become increasingly affordable down the social scale, and so widely used, from about the Ming dynasty onwards. Carved lacquer furniture was at first only affordable by the imperial family or the extremely rich, but by the 19th century was merely very expensive, and mostly found in smaller pieces or as decorated areas on larger ones. It was especially popular on screens, which were common in China. Lacquer inlaid with mother of pearl was especially a technique used on furniture.

Chinese furniture is usually light where possible, anticipating Europe by several centuries in this respect. Practical fittings in metal such as hinges, lock plates, drawer handles and protective plates at edges or feet are used, and often given considerable emphasis, but compared to classic fine European furniture purely decorative metal mounts were rare. From the Qing dynasty furniture made for export, mostly to Europe, became a distinct style, generally made in rather different shapes to suit the destination markets and highly decorated in lacquer and other techniques.

Early traditional Chinese furniture for sitting or lying on was not often covered with soft material. Not until very late historical periods, cushions, textiles, and other forms of upholstery were incorporated into Chinese furniture impacted by the Western culture. Openwork in carved wood or other techniques is very typical for practical purposes such as chair-backs, and also for decoration. The Ming period is regarded as the "golden age" of Chinese furniture, though very few examples of earlier pieces survive. Ming styles have largely set the style for furniture in traditional Chinese style in subsequent periods, though as in other areas of Chinese art, the 18th and 19th centuries saw increasing prosperity used for sometimes excessively elaborated pieces, as wider groups in society were able to imitate court styles.

Cultural context
What is now considered the Chinese aesthetic had its origins in China as far back as 1500–1000 BC. The furniture present in some of the artwork from that early period shows woven mats on elevated floors, sometimes accompanied by arm rests, providing seating accompanied by low tables. In this early period both unadorned and intricately engraved and painted pieces were already developing. High chairs, usually single ones, had existed as status symbols, effectively thrones, since at least the Eastern Zhou period (771–256 BCE), but were not used with tables at the same level.

The use of screens has been recorded since the Shang and Zhou dynasties, which shows that society is in civilization and society is in progress. It plays a role in dividing space and beautifying the environment. It has privacy, comfort and security.

The Han Dynasty still sat on the ground, and indoor life was centered on beds and couch. The function of beds was not only to sleep, but also to have meals, conversations and other activities. A large number of portrait bricks and stones of the Han Dynasty reflected such scenes. The bed is slightly different from the couch. The bed is higher than the couch and wider than the couch. Moreover, in this era, curtains were used, and curtains set on beds also played an important role, indicating that society was in the progress of civilization, avoiding mosquitoes in summer and keeping out the wind and cold in winter. At the same time, they played a role of beautification and were also a sign of identity and wealth．

Buddhism, entering China around AD 200, brought with it the idea of (the Buddha) sitting upon a raised platform instead of simply mats. The platform was adopted as an honorific seat for special guests and dignitaries or officials. Longer versions were then used for reclining as well, which eventually evolved into the bed and daybed. Taller versions evolved into higher tables as well. The folding stool also proliferated similarly, after it was adapted from designs developed by nomadic tribes to the North and West, who used them for both their convenience and light weight in many applications such as mounting horses. Later, woven hourglass-shaped stools evolved; a design still in use today throughout China.

Some of the styles now widely regarded as Chinese began appearing more prominently in the Tang dynasty (618–907 AD). It is here that evidence of early versions of the round and yoke back chairs are found, generally used by the elite. By the next two Dynasties (the Northern and Southern Song) the use of varying types of furniture, including chairs, benches, and stools was common throughout Chinese society. Two particular developments were recessed legs and waisted tables. Newer and more complex designs were generally limited to official and higher class use.

In the Song Dynasty, high furniture for sitting with feet hanging occupied an absolutely dominant position. Sitting with feet hanging has become a fixed posture, and the daily life in Chinese history has been fundamentally changed, which depends on the sitting posture. Furniture in the Song Dynasty shows the characteristics of straightness and beauty in its overall style. Its decoration inherits the style of the Five Dynasties and tends to be simple and elegant. It does not make large-scale carving decoration, but only takes local decorations to make the finishing point.

At the beginning of the Qing Dynasty, the style of Ming style furniture was continued. Chinese traditional furniture technology developed to the Yongzheng and Qianlong periods of the Qing Dynasty, forming a Qing style school different from Ming style furniture. The Qing Dynasty experienced the Kangxi, Yongzheng and Qianlong periods, and there was a luxurious and decadent trend of blindly pursuing richness, luxury, and red tape in social culture at that time. There is a strong contrast with Ming style furniture, so it is called "Qing style" furniture in the history of furniture in China. Qing style furniture is made of thick and heavy materials, and its variety and decoration pursue innovation. The decoration of Qing style furniture seeks more, fullness, wealth and splendor. A variety of materials are used together, and a variety of processes are combined.

More modern Chinese furniture developed its distinguishing characteristics. The use of thick lacquer finish and detailed engraving and painted decoration as well as pragmatic design elements would continue to flourish. Significant foreign design influence would not be felt until increased contact with the West began in the 19th century, due to efforts on the part of the ruling elite to limit trade. 

In recent decades, there is a trend of re-designing Chinese furniture in a more modern perspective. The exceptional quality and innovation of the furniture associated with what has already become known as ‘New Chinese Design’ will undoubtedly set in motion a significant reappraisal of contemporary Chinese design in general. The first thing to understand about New Chinese Design is that it is foremost a design reform movement. Ideologically guided, it has been responsible for an extraordinary renaissance within Chinese furniture design, the first green shoots of which began to emerge in isolation with the designs of Samuel Chan in Britain during the late 1980s. The process of integrating traditional culture and contemporary style in furniture was initiated by designers such as Zhu Xiaojie, Chi Wing Lo, Chen Renyi, Shan Fan, Shi Jianmin and Song Tao, but many others have since joined the movement, notably Lv Yongzhong, Lydon Neri, Rossana Hum Jiang Qiong’er, Jeff Shi Dayu, Wen Hao, Shen Baohong, Studio MVW, Chen Darui, Zhong Song, Chen Yanfei and Jerry Chen.

During the Ming and Qing dynasties previous bans on imports were lifted, allowing for larger quantities and varieties of woods to flood in from other parts of Asia. The use of denser wood led to much finer work, including more elaborate joinery. A Ming Imperial table entirely covered in carved lacquer, now in London, is one of the finest survivals of the period.

Ming Dynasty furniture 
Chinese furniture flourished in Ming and Qing dynasties; as the result, the Ming-style furniture and the Qing-style furniture become the representative traditional Chinese furniture people often see today. Suzhou, an area in Jiangsu Province, is distinguished by the fine production techniques of Ming-style furniture. Thus, Ming-style furniture is also known as Suzhou-style furniture.

Shape, style and culture 

Ming dynasty furniture is distinguished by its simpleness of shape. It does not focus on the rich and complicated decorative patterns but the elegance of style and the beauty of lines. Ming furniture stresses the smoothness of lines: it looks unobtrusive, blends curves and straight lines, and creates a sense of balance and harmony. This feature is particularly prominent in the Quanyi (圈椅）Circular Chairs, an example of the combination of curves and lines. Moreover, Ming furniture is noted by its ergonomic design. It attaches importance to the rationality of scale and curvature, which makes people feel comfortable while sitting on a hard wooden chair. For example, the backrest of Ming furniture is in the shape of "S" or "C". This special shape conforms to the characteristics of the human spine curve, allowing people to sit on their backs to rest and relieve fatigue. The round crescent armrest of the chair has a natural slope from high to low, allowing people to rest their shoulders and arms on the arc-shaped armrests. Overall, the function and aesthetics of Ming furniture are emphasized by its unique shape and refined structure.

Culture has a deep impact on traditional Chinese throughout history. Taking Ming Dynasty furniture as an example, artistic symbolism reflects the philosophy of ancient Chinese culture. Both the pleasing aesthetics and the symbolic meaning of Ming Dynasty furniture contribute to advocating the Chinese style towards contemporary home furnishing. As a visualization of Confucian philosophy, the form and auspicious decorative patterns of Ming Dynasty furniture symbolize the  expression of Neutralization thought, the thought of harmony, the importance of going into the world, which encourages the user to be more practical and more responsible. Altogether, design of Ming Dynasty furniture reflects people’s pursuit of wealth, peace, harmony and rights.

Decoration 
Ming furniture pursues small and refined decoration, which leads to a moderate and artistic decoration concept. The main decoration methods in Ming furniture include inlay, carving, and lacquerware. The materials used in inlay are varied, including enamel, bamboo, animal’s horn or teeth, jade, stone, copper, etc. However, Ming furniture does not aim to have all the luxuries in one piece, it highlights the beauty of wood through the raw materials. Partial or small area relief and openwork have become the main means of decoration for many Ming furniture; swastika, cloud, and Ruyi are the common patterns for this type of decoration. Besides, the application of metal accessories is another major feature of Ming furniture decoration. Copper, as the most commonly used metal in Ming furniture, is usually decorated on the corners, feet, and handles of the furniture. These metal fittings are not only serving for aesthetics but also for enhancing wear resistance at the same time.

Material 
Ming furniture is made of a wide range of materials, including wood, stone, and other auxiliary materials. The choice of wood is usually hardwood, such as huanghuali (黄花梨), red sandalwood, rosewood, chicken-wing wood (鸡翅木), beech, and Cassia siamea. Among those hardwoods, huanghuali was especially popular in the Ming dynasty because of its texture, color, and odor. Among all the stone materials, marble, agate, and Nanyang stone are the common materials for inlay. Rattan, rope, and bamboo are often used as auxiliary materials in Ming furniture as well.

Four categories
Chinese furniture traditionally consisted of four distinct categories, all formed by the mid Qing dynasty, but each with its own unique characteristics.
Beijing category (京式家具): characterized by its simple build, directly developed from Ming Dynasty furnitures.
Guangzhou category (广式家具): incorporating western influence, fully formed in the 19th century but dating back to at least 17th century. Characterized by the adoptation of Baroque and Rococo artistic styles, use of native timbers in the Lingnan region, and the decorative mounting of marble and the shells of shellfish.
Shanghai category (海式家具): characterized by its decorative carving and carved lacquer.
Suzhou category (苏式家具): Suzhou area is the main birthplace of Ming-style furniture in China, so Su-style furniture is a typical representative of Ming-style furniture.

Material
Classic Chinese furniture is typically made of a class of hardwoods, known collectively as "rosewood" (紅木, literally "red wood"). These woods are denser than water, fine grained, and high in oils and resins. These properties make them dimensionally stable, hardwearing, rot and insect resistant, and when new, highly fragrant. The density and toughness of the wood also allows furniture to be built without the use of glue and nail, but rather constructed from joinery and doweling alone. According to the Chinese industry standards the woods are grouped into eight classes:

Furniture and carving made from these wood species are typically referred to, in the market, as "Hongmu Furniture" (紅木家具, literally "rosewood furniture"). Due to overlogging for the said furniture, most of the species are either threatened or endangered.

Chinese furniture using precious wood also has property attributes, which is appreciation. This is due to the use of precious hardwood and high labour costs, durability, and it can be passed on to future generations as property. Hardwood like Huali Wood (花梨木) and Suanzhi (酸枝) are the most representative, and the price of the raw material spiked over the past decades. Taking Huali Wood as an example, one of the most famous and expensive precious wood, the price skyrockets due to the scarcity of old trees. The growth cycle of Hualimu tree is extremely long making it unimaginably difficult to become timber—800 years. By the end of the Ming Dynasty, all of Hualimu tree was felled in China. The price of Hualimu is 8-12 million RMB (approximately1.5-2.4 million CAD) per ton in 2004. In 2020, the price increased to 18 million RMB (approximately 3.4 million CAD) per ton and is expected to keep increasing. In China, some manufacturers grasped this opportunity by replicating the traditional design from precious hardwood with the help of machinery making the old design more accessible to certain consumers. There is a niche market for high-end collectors to appreciate traditional Chinese furniture not only for the timeless design but also the opportunity to invest or to show social status.

Construction

Construction of traditional wooden Chinese furniture is based primarily of solid wood pieces connected solely using woodworking joints, and rarely using glue or metallic nails. The reason was that the nails and glues used did not stand up well to the vastly fluctuating temperatures and humid weather conditions in most of Central and Southeast Asia. Further, the oily and resinous woods used in Chinese furniture generally do not glue well, even when pre-cleaned with modern industrial solvents.

Platform construction is based on box designs and uses frame-and-panel construction in simple form during earlier periods evolving into more and more modified forms in later periods. While earlier pieces show full frame-and-panel construction techniques, different parts of the construction were modified through the centuries to produce diverse looking pieces which still share the same basic construction. First the panel, originally complete, is subject to cut-out sections, followed by further reduction to what may appear to be simply decorative brackets. Further refinement of the same pattern lead the shape of the decorative brackets being incorporated into the shape of the surrounding frame and simultaneously the two mitered vertical pieces comprising a corner become one solid piece. Pieces start to have small cross-pieces attached to the bottom of the feet rather than a frame that is equal on all sides and finally, with evolution of the complex woodworking joints that allow it, the cross-pieces are removed entirely, leaving a modern table with 3-way mitered corners. Unlike European-derived styles, table designs based on this style will nearly always contain a frame-in-panel top, the panel serving as the tabletop center and the frame sometimes also serving as what would be rails on a European table. Cabinets in this style have a top that does not protrude beyond the sides or front. The critical element in almost all pieces of this type is the mitered joints, especially the 3-way mitered joining of the leg and two horizontal pieces at each corner.

The Yoke and Rack construction differs critically in the way that the legs of the piece are joined to the horizontal portion (be it tabletop, seat or cabinet carcass) using a type of wedged mortise-and-tenon joint where the end grain of the leg is visible as a circle in the frame of the tabletop. The cross-pieces (stretchers in the western equivalent) are joined through mortise-and-tenon joinery as well. Mortise (卯) is a slot or recess. And Tenon (榫) is the projecting end of a piece of wood formed to fit into a corresponding mortise. Mortise-and-tenon joinery is an extremely old construction technique that has stood the test of time and is still being used today. The legs and stretchers are commonly round rather than square or curvilinear. The simplest pieces are simply four splayed legs attached to a solid top, but more complicated pieces contain decorative brackets, drawers and metal latches. Cabinets in this style typically have an overhanging top similar to western-style cabinetry.

Bamboo construction style, although historically rooted in pieces made from bamboo, later saw many pieces made from hardwood with patterning to imitate the look of bamboo, or simply in the style of previous pieces made from bamboo. The construction is more similar to the Yoke and Rack style with some apparent crossover.

Gallery

See also

Gustav Ecke

Notes

References
 
"Grove", Handler, Sarah, Oxford Art Online, "China, XII. Furniture", Subscription required

"Chinese Classical Furniture: Antique and Ingenious". China Today. 2018-07-10. Retrieved 2021-04-20.
Wang, Shixiang; Yuan, Quanyou (1990). Connoisseurship of Chinese Furniture: Ming and Early Qing Dynasties.
Liu, Rui (March 2016). "Ergonomics of Ming Dynasty Chair Furniture". Packing Engineering. 37 (6).
Ma, Xuguang (2012-09-20). "从明清两代家具的风格看不同时期历史文化的差异". Journal of Kaifeng Institute of Education. 32(3).
Dong, Yunzhi (2009). "明清家具装饰风格比较研究". 美与时代（上）. 8.

External links
 Classical Chinese Furniture: Information Cybercenter for the Collector and Scholar. Includes images of datable furniture, explanations of joinery and construction, a lengthy bibliographical section.

Arts in China
 
History of furniture